This is a list of electoral results for the Electoral district of Springvale in Victorian state elections.

Members for Springvale

Election results

Elections in the 1990s

Elections in the 1980s 

 The DLP candidate John Mulholland was also endorsed by Call to Australia.

Elections in the 1970s

References

Victoria (Australia) state electoral results by district